Rugby High School is a public high school located in Rugby, North Dakota. It is a part of Rugby Public Schools. The athletic teams are known as the Panthers.

Rugby High serves Rugby, Balta, Barton, and Orrin in Pierce County, and Knox in Benson County. The district also includes a section of Rolette County.

Its projected high school enrollment for the 1988-1989 school year was 260.

Athletics
In 1988 the North Dakota High School Activities Association classified Rugby High School as Class A. That year the school was seeking to be placed in Class B and formally petitioned to do so.

Championships
State Class 'B' boys' basketball: 1940, 1941, 1962, 2015
State Class 'A' boys' basketball: 1962
State Class 'B' boys' track and field: 1992, 1996, 2010
State Class 'B' boys' cross country: 2009, 2011
State Class 'B' girls' cross country: 2010, 2019, 2020
State Class 'B' girls' track and field: 2009, 2011

References

External links
Rugby High School
Rugby School District

Public high schools in North Dakota
North Dakota High School Activities Association (Class B)
North Dakota High School Activities Association (Class AA Football)
Schools in Pierce County, North Dakota
Rugby, North Dakota